Peter Vincent de Cruz (born 4 January 1990) is a Swiss curler. He is an Olympic bronze medallist for Switzerland, having skipped his Swiss rink to a third place finish at the 2018 Winter Olympics in Pyeongchang. While de Cruz is the skip of his team, he throws second stones. 

As a junior, De Cruz skipped the Swiss team at both the 2010 and 2011 World Junior Curling Championships. He won the gold medal in 2010, defeating Scotland, skipped by Ally Fraser. In 2011, he took Switzerland to the finals once again, but this time lost to Sweden (skipped by Oskar Eriksson) in the final.

De Cruz has won bronze medals at three World Curling Championship,  in 2014, 2017 and 2019. He led Switzerland to a silver medal at the 2015 European Curling Championships and bronze medals at the 2017 and 2018 European Curling Championships.

De Cruz has won eight World Curling Tour events in his career, the 2011 and 2018 Curling Masters Champéry, the 2012 Challenge Casino de Charlevoix, the 2016 Baden Masters, the 2018 Meridian Canadian Open Grand Slam, the 2019 Swiss Cup Basel, the 2019 Schweizer Cup and the 2020 Adelboden International.

Personal life
De Cruz currently resides in Carouge, Canton of Geneva.

Grand Slam record

References

External links

Swiss male curlers
1990 births
Living people
Sportspeople from the canton of Geneva
Sportspeople from London
Swiss curling champions
Continental Cup of Curling participants
Curlers at the 2018 Winter Olympics
Olympic curlers of Switzerland
Olympic bronze medalists for Switzerland
Medalists at the 2018 Winter Olympics
Olympic medalists in curling
People from Carouge
Curlers at the 2022 Winter Olympics
21st-century Swiss people